Brampton North is a federal electoral district in Ontario, Canada. It encompass portions of Ontario formerly included in the electoral districts of Brampton—Springdale, Bramalea—Gore—Malton and Brampton West.

Brampton North was created by the 2012 federal electoral boundaries redistribution and was legally defined in the 2013 representation order. It came into effect upon the call of the 42nd Canadian federal election held in October 2015.

Demographics 
According to the 2021 Canada Census

Ethnic groups: 49.3% South Asian, 23.1% White, 12.5% Black, 3.0% Filipino, 2.0% Latin American, 1.2% Southeast Asian, 1.2% Chinese

Languages: 45.8% English, 22.4% Punjabi, 3.0% Urdu, 2.7% Gujarati, 2.4% Hindi, 1.8% Spanish, 1.7% Tamil, 1.4% Tagalog, 1.4% Italian, 1.1% Portuguese

Religions: 38.4% Christian (19.1% Catholic, 2.3% Pentecostal, 1.9% Anglican, 1.2% United Church, 1.0% Christian Orthodox, 12.9% Other), 25.6% Sikh, 14.7% Hindu, 8.8% Muslim, 1.1% Buddhist, 11.0% None

Median income: $36,800 (2020)

Average income: $46,080 (2020)

Members of Parliament

This riding has elected the following Members of Parliament:

Election results

References

Ontario federal electoral districts
Politics of Brampton
2013 establishments in Ontario